Stefan Fröhlich is the name of:

 Stefan Fröhlich (German general) (1889–1978), German general
 Stefan Fröhlich (political scientist) (born 1958), German political scientist